The Upukerora River is a river in New Zealand, flowing into Lake Te Anau north of Te Anau township.

See also 
List of rivers of New Zealand

References 

Rivers of Southland, New Zealand
Rivers of New Zealand